Schizovalva exsulata is a moth of the family Gelechiidae. It was described by Edward Meyrick in 1918. It is found in South Africa.

The wingspan is about 12 mm. The forewings are blackish with a moderately broad irregular-edged ochreous-whitish dorsal streak from the base to the tornus, its upper edge rather triangular-prominent at the middle and three-fourths of the length. There is a short oblique ochreous-white streak from the costa at four-fifths and a triangular clear white spot occupying the lower two-thirds of the termen. The hindwings are grey.

References

Endemic moths of South Africa
Moths described in 1918
Schizovalva